Jonathan Augustavo, better known as Jon Jon or Jon Jon Augustavo, is an American filmmaker, commercial director, and music video director who has written and directed works for artists including Macklemore & Ryan Lewis, Mike Posner, Allen Stone, Vicci Martinez, Nipsey Hussle, Blue Scholars, The Physics, Sammy Adams, among others. He is of mixed Filipino and American ethnicity.

His most notable videos coming with Macklemore & Ryan Lewis with "Thrift Shop," "Can't Hold Us" and "Same Love," which have combined for over 800 million views since their release.

Jon Jon's videos for Macklemore "Thrift Shop," "Can't Hold Us," & "Same Love," were nominated for 6 2013 MTV Video Music Awards, including Video of the year, Best Hip Hop video, Best Video with a Social Message, Best Direction, Best Cinematography and Best Editing. "Same Love," took home the award for Best Video with a Social Message and "Can't Hold Us," won Best Cinematography and Best Hip Hop Video.

Jon Jon is a graduate of Art Center College of Design  in Pasadena, California.

Awards

Notable videos

2016
Afrojack & Fais "Used to Have it All"
Milow "No No No"
KOLAJ & Eric Nam "Into You"
DVBBS "LA LA Land"
Mike Posner "I Took a Pill in Ibiza (SeeB Remix)"

2015
DJ Fresh "Believer"
Shawn Mendes "Aftertaste"
Shawn Mendes "Stitches"
Shawn Mendes "Life of the Party"
Kygo "Firestone"
Magic! "No Way No"
Shawn Mendes "Never Be Alone"
Greg Holden "Hold On Tight"
NF "Wake Up"

2014
Shawn Mendes "Something Big"
Schoolboy Q "Hell of a Night"
The Head and the Heart "Let's Be Still"
Panama Wedding "All of The People"
Romeo Testa "I'm So Down"
Ella Eyre "Comeback"
SOJA "I Believe"
Avi Buffalo "So What"
Big Freedia "Explode"
Kopecky Family Band "Are You Listening"
Mary Lambert "Body Love"
 Example "Kids Again"
 Sol "Tomorrow"

2013
 Mike Posner "Top of The World feat. Big Sean"
 Romeo Testa "With You"
 MKTO "God Only Knows"
 Tori Kelly "Dear No One"
 Tinie Tempah "Children of The Sun feat. John Martin"
 Sammy Adams "LA Story feat. Mike Posner"
 Little Nikki "Little Nikki Says"
 The Midnight Beast "Bassface"
 Macklemore & Ryan Lewis "Can't Hold Us (feat. Ray Dalton)"
 Vicci Martinez "Come Along feat. Cee Lo Green"
 Allen Stone "Celebrate Tonight"
 Jarvis "Make A Little Room"
 Theo Martins "KILLER Ft. Maryann Vasquez"

2012
 Macklemore & Ryan Lewis "Same Love"
 Macklemore & Ryan Lewis "Thrift Shop"
 Nipsey Hussle "Rose Clique"
 Blue Scholars "Seijun Suzuki"
 Avatar Young Blaze "Feeding My Flame"
 Eighty4 Fly "Cool Kids"

References

External links
 
 Jon Jon Augustavo IMVDb Profile
 

Year of birth missing (living people)
Living people
American music video directors